Sengstock is a surname. Notable people with the surname include:

 Larry Sengstock (born 1960), Australian basketball player
 Roy H. Sengstock (1913–1981), American politician